Fernand Joseph Cheri III, OFM (born January 28, 1952) is an American prelate of the Catholic Church. A member of the Order of Friars Minor,  Cheri has served as an auxiliary bishop of Archdiocese of New Orleans since 2015.

Biography

Early life 
Fernand Cheri  was born on January 28, 1952, in New Orleans to Fernand Jr. and Gladys Cheri. He received his high school education at St. John Vianney Preparatory Seminary in New Orleans. He went on to study at St. Joseph Seminary College in Covington, Louisiana and Notre Dame Seminary in New Orleans.

Priesthood 
Cheri was ordained a priest for the Archdiocese of New Orleans by Archbishop Philip Hannan on May 20, 1978. After his ordination. Cheri received a Master of Theology degree from the Xavier University of Louisiana Institute for Black Catholic Studies in New Orleans. Cheri's first pastoral assignment was as the parochial vicar at Our Lady of Lourdes Parish in New Orleans and St. Joseph the Worker Parish in Marrero, Louisiana, serving both parishes until 1984.  He then became the pastor of St. Joseph the Worker Parish in 1984 and after a year became the pastor of St. Francis de Sales Parish in New Orleans from 1985 to 1990.  Cheri was appointed administrator of St. Theresa of the Child Jesus Parish in New Orleans from 1990 to 1991.

Cheri entered the novitiate of the Sacred Heart Province of the Order of Friars Minor (Franciscans) in 1992.  He professed solemn vows in the order on August 26, 1996. As a Franciscan, Cheri served as chaplain at Hales Franciscan High School in Chicago from 1994 to 1996.  He served as pastor of St. Vincent de Paul Parish in Nashville, Tennessee from 1996 to 2002. During that time he also served as a member of the provincial council for the Franciscan Province of the Sacred Heart from 1999 to 2002.  

Cheri was assigned to St. Benedict the Black Friary in East St. Louis, Illinois from 2002 to 2007 and taught high school in East St. Louis, Illinois. He undertook continuing education from 2007 to 2008, and then served as director of the Office of Friar Life in East St. Louis from 2008 to 2009, and as associate director of campus ministry at Xavier University from 2010 to 2011.  Cheri then served as director of campus ministry at Quincy University in Quincy, Illinois, and as vicar of the Holy Cross Friary in Quincy from 2011 to 2015.  Cheri has written articles and books on African-American Catholic liturgy, and served as an archivist of Black religious music.

Auxiliary bishop of New Orleans 
Cheri was named the Titular bishop of Membressa and auxiliary bishop of the Archdiocese of New Orleans by Pope Francis on January 12, 2015.  His episcopal consecration took place on March 23, 2015 at the Cathedral-Basilica of Saint Louis, King of France in New Orleans.  Archbishop Gregory Aymond of New Orleans was the consecrator.  Archbishop Wilton Gregory and Bishop J. Terry Steib were the co-consecrators.

See also

 Catholic Church hierarchy
 Catholic Church in the United States
 Historical list of the Catholic bishops of the United States
 List of Catholic bishops of the United States
 Lists of patriarchs, archbishops, and bishops

References

External links

 Roman Catholic Archdiocese of New Orleans Official Site

Episcopal succession

 

1952 births
Living people
People from New Orleans
Notre Dame Seminary alumni
Xavier University of Louisiana alumni
African-American Roman Catholic bishops
21st-century Roman Catholic bishops in the United States
Franciscan bishops
Roman Catholic Archdiocese of New Orleans
Roman Catholic bishops in Louisiana
Bishops appointed by Pope Francis
Knights of Peter Claver & Ladies Auxiliary
African-American Catholic consecrated religious